The Chudasama are a Rajput clan found in the state of Gujarat in India. They are offshoot of the Samma tribe of Sind.  The Chudasama dynasty of Junagadh once ruled Thatta of Sind and Chudachandra laid foundation in Gujarat with Junagadh as its capital.

References 

Indian surnames
Rajput clans of Gujarat
Samma tribes
Chudasama dynasty